Jainendra Kumar (2 January 1905 – 24 December 1988) was a 20th century Indian writer who wrote in Hindi. He wrote novels include Sunita and Tyagapatra. He was awarded one of India's highest civilian honours, the Padma Bhushan in 1971. He was awarded the Sahitya Akademi Award by the Sahitya Akademi in 1966, for his work Muktibodh (novelette), and its highest award, the Sahitya Akademi Fellowship in 1979.

Literary works

Suneeta
Neelam Desh ki Rajkanya
Chidiya Ki Bhachi
Ek Raat
Vatayan
Parakh
Ankita
Sukhda
Kalyani
Jayvardhan
Dashark
Akal Purush Gandhi
Premchand: Ek Krati Vyaktitva
Sahitya ka Shrey Aur Prey
Samay Aur Hum
Jeevan Sahitya Aur Paramparayein
Gandhi aur Humara Samay Tatha Sanskriti
Khel
Pajeb 
Patni
Apna Apna Bhagya
Muktibodh
"Atma Shikshan" (short story)

Translations
Prem Mein Bhagwaan
Paap Aur Prakash
Yama

Awards and honors
 Hindustan Academy Puraskar, 1929 for Parakh
 Sahitya Akademi Award, 1953 for Paap Aur Prakash
 Hastimal Dalmiya Puraskar, 1965 for Muktibodh
 Padma Bhushan, 1971
 Sahitya Akademi Fellowship, 1979

References

External links
Hindi Literature
Literacy India - Hindi Literature 

1905 births
1988 deaths
Novelists from Uttar Pradesh
Hindi-language writers
Recipients of the Padma Bhushan in literature & education
Recipients of the Sahitya Akademi Fellowship
Recipients of the Sahitya Akademi Award in Hindi
People from Aligarh
20th-century Indian translators
20th-century Indian novelists